NC Medical College and Hospital is a medical institute in Panipat, Haryana. It was the first COVID-19 hospital of the city and was also declared as the isolation ward of 60 beds.The hospital has 300 beds also has a blood bank. It got the permission to accept students for MBBS in 2019 A CME  (Continuing Medical Education) training  was organised in the institute

Controversy 
Supreme Court of India ordered Medical Council of India to make a surprise visit for inspection after receiving several complains. An MCI report in 2016 alleged that  the college lacked faculty and residents by 93.85% and 97.83% respectively.  The total occupancy of beds was 1% only and that the residents were not staying at campus. It also remarked the absence of medical superintendent. But, the college claimed that there was full strength of both faculty and residents. Bed occupancy was claimed to be above 60% by the institute. Hindustan Times did an independent investigation in September (MCI report was filed in January) and found occupancy between 10 and 20%. The overall condition was reported to be good by the newspaper.

References 

Hospitals in Haryana
Year of establishment missing
Panipat